Re matto live is the first live album by Italian singer Marco Mengoni, released on 19 October 2010 by Sony Music. It features songs from his previous EPs, Re matto and Dove si vola, as well as covers of popular songs, originally performed by Italian singers such as Mina and Mia Martini, or by international artists like Jamiroquai and The Beatles.

The album includes a DVD and a Compact Disc. The DVD was recorded during Megoni's concert in Genova, on 15 July 2010, while the CD was recorded in Montesilvano (Pescara) on 27 July 2010.

Track listing

Charts and certifications

Year-end charts

References 

2010 live albums
Sony Music Italy albums
Marco Mengoni albums
Italian-language live albums